Laurence Freeman OSB (born 17 July 1951) is a Catholic priest and a Benedictine monk of Monastery of Sta Maria di Pilastrello, in Italy, a monastery of the Olivetan Congregation. He is the Director of the World Community for Christian Meditation and of its Benedictine oblate community.

Biography
Born in England in 1951, he was educated by the Benedictines and studied English literature at New College, Oxford. Before entering monastic life he worked in the fields of banking and journalism and at the United Nations.

In 1975, Freeman joined Fr John Main OSB at Ealing Abbey in London, as part of the first experimental lay community dedicated to living a Benedictine life with Christian meditation as its contemplative practice. From this was established the Christian Meditation Centre in London. In 1977 at the invitation of the Archbishop of Montreal, he went to Canada with Main to establish a Benedictine community of monks and laypeople dedicated to the practice and teaching of Christian meditation. Freeman studied theology at the Université de Montréal and at McGill University. He made his solemn monastic profession of religious vows in 1979 and was ordained to the priesthood in 1980.
 
After John Main’s death in 1982, Freeman continued the work of teaching meditation that had now begun to develop into a global community. He continues to travel the world giving talks and retreats.

In 1991 he returned to live in England to establish the international centre of the newly formed World Community for Christian Meditation that is now present in over 100 countries.

Strongly committed to inter-religious dialogue and international peace initiatives, between 1998 and 2000 Freeman took part in the historic "Way of Peace" programme – a series of Christian-Buddhist dialogues with the Dalai Lama in India, Italy and Belfast. The programme continued in 2013 with further dialogues in Sarnath, India. In 2006 he co-hosted a meeting at York University exploring the common ground between Christianity and Islam. He was a keynote speaker at the World Parliament of Religions in Melbourne, Australia, in 2009.

Freeman was awarded the Order of Canada in 2010 in recognition of his work of interfaith dialogue and the promotion of world peace.

Freeman’s work also involves encouraging the teaching of meditation to children and students. He founded the John Main Center for Meditation and Inter-Religious Dialogue at Georgetown University in the United States and sees the contemplative dimension of knowledge as an essential characteristic of all true education. In 2010 he launched the Meditatio outreach programme of WCCM to mark the celebration of its twentieth anniversary. Meditatio hosts seminars, forums and workshops to engage in dialogue with the secular world and produces publications and resources on the themes of education, mental health, business, addiction and recovery, interfaith and other topics.

Through the World Community for Christian Meditation, now established as a contemporary and ecumenical contemplative community, Freeman continues the work of teaching Christian meditation and restoring the contemplative as an essential and central dimension of all Christian spirituality.

Writings 
Freeman is the author of many books, including Light Within, Selfless Self, Your Daily Practice, The Inner Pilgrimage, Jesus: The Teacher Within and First Sight: The Experience of Faith. He writes for journals and magazines and is a regular contributor to The Tablet. He is also the principal editor of John Main’s works.

 Meditation (2019)
Sensing God: Meditation for Lent (2016)
 Why are we here? (2012)
 The Goal of Life (2012)
 First Sight: The Experience of Faith (2011)
 Jesus, the Teacher Within (2010)
 The Selfless Self (2009)
 Light Within (1986) ISBN 0 232 51683 9<ref>
 Christian Meditation: Your Daily Practice (2007)
 The Inner Pilgrimage (2007)
 A Simple Way (2004)
 A Pearl of Great Price (2002)
 Common Ground (1999)
 Web of Silence (1998)
 A Short Span of Days (1991)

References

External links 
 Freeman's profile on the World Community for Christian Meditation website
 Meditation with Children - Directed by Laurence Freeman OSB
 Christian Meditation Groups - A Pearl of Great Price, Laurence Freeman OSB, author
 Christian Meditation as an 11th Step Recovery Program
 La Meditación Cristiana
 The John Main Center and inter-religious dialogue, Georgetown University - Founder Father Laurence Freeman
 Fr Laurence Freeman page, Russian WCCM site
 Fr Laurence Freeman page, Ukrainian WCCM site

1951 births
Living people
People educated at St Benedict's School, Ealing
Alumni of New College, Oxford
English Benedictines
Université de Montréal alumni
McGill University alumni
20th-century English Roman Catholic priests
21st-century English Roman Catholic priests
Officers of the Order of Canada